Callum Robertson (born 12 July 1996) is a Scottish football (soccer) player who plays as a forward, he is currently a free agent after leaving SJFA East Premier League side Whitburn Junior.

Career
Born in Livingston, Robertson began his career with Raith Rovers. He was first included in a matchday squad on 16 November 2013, remaining an unused substitute in a 1–0 away defeat to Alloa Athletic in the Scottish Championship, his only inclusion that season. His debut came on 2 May 2015 as Raith concluded the season with a 2–2 draw at Dumbarton, replacing Mark Stewart in added time.

In January 2016 he was released by the club.  He had been on loan at Linlithgow Rose.

References

External links

1996 births
Living people
Sportspeople from Livingston, West Lothian
Scottish footballers
Association football forwards
Raith Rovers F.C. players
Whitburn Junior F.C. players
Linlithgow Rose F.C. players
Scottish Professional Football League players
Footballers from West Lothian